Paavo Miettinen (20 May 1919 – 8 June 1985) was a Finnish fencer. He competed in the team épée event at the 1952 Summer Olympics.

References

External links
 

1919 births
1985 deaths
Finnish male épée fencers
Olympic fencers of Finland
Fencers at the 1952 Summer Olympics
People from Viipuri Province (Grand Duchy of Finland)